Argyrophora is a genus of moths in the family Geometridae first described by Achille Guenée in 1858.

Species
Argyrophora arcualis Duncan [& Westwood], 1841
Argyrophora trofonia Cramer, [1779]

References

Nacophorini
Geometridae genera